Gymnoscelis yurikae is a moth in the family Geometridae. It was described by Inoue in 2002. It is endemic to Japan.

References

Moths described in 2002
Endemic fauna of Japan
yurikae
Moths of Japan
Taxa named by Hiroshi Inoue